Stewart or Stuart Bruce may refer to:

Stewart Bruce (cricketer) (born 1969), Scottish cricketer
Sir Stewart Bruce, 1st Baronet (c. 1764–1841), of the Bruce baronets
Stuart Bruce (engineer) (born 1962), English recording engineer

See also
Bruce Stewart (disambiguation)
Bruce (surname)